Ischnocnema spanios is a species of frog in the family Brachycephalidae.
It is endemic to Brazil.
Its natural habitat is tropical moist lowland forest.
It is threatened by habitat loss.

References

spanios
Endemic fauna of Brazil
Amphibians of Brazil
Taxonomy articles created by Polbot
Amphibians described in 1985